Another Place, Another Time may refer to:

 Another Place, Another Time (album), a 1968 album by Jerry Lee Lewis released
 "Another Place, Another Time" (Don Williams song), 1988
 "Another Place, Another Time" (Del Reeves song), a song originally recorded by Del Reeves and covered by Jerry Lee Lewis

See also
 Another Time, Another Place (disambiguation)